Li Dongheng (born July 1944) is a retired lieutenant general in the People's Liberation Army of China. He was a member of the 16th Central Committee of the Chinese Communist Party. He was a member of the Standing Committee of the 11th Chinese People's Political Consultative Conference.

Biography
Li was born in Neixiang County, Henan, in July 1944. After graduating from Shanghai Jiao Tong University in 1968, he enlisted in the People's Liberation Army (PLA). He served in the People's Liberation Army Ground Force between March 1970 and November 1983. After working in the People's Liberation Army General Political Department for about three years, he was appointed director of Political Department of the 39th Group Army in July 1986. In June 1990, he became deputy political commissioner, rising to political commissioner in February 1993. In April 1996, he became director of Political Department of the People's Armed Police, he remained in that position until December 2003, when he was chosen as deputy political commissioner of the People's Liberation Army General Armaments Department and deputy secretary of the Discipline Inspection Commission of the Central Military Commission.

He was promoted to the rank of lieutenant general (zhongjiang) in December 2003.

References

1944 births
Living people
People from Neixiang County
Shanghai Jiao Tong University alumni
People's Liberation Army generals from Henan
People's Republic of China politicians from Henan
Chinese Communist Party politicians from Henan
Members of the 16th Central Committee of the Chinese Communist Party
Members of the Standing Committee of the 11th Chinese People's Political Consultative Conference